Aleksandr Sergeyevich Vezdenetskiy (born 6 February 1982) is a Russian professional football coach and a former player. He is an assistant coach for the Under-19 squad of FC Arsenal Tula.

Club career
He played in the Russian Football National League  for FC Arsenal Tula in 2004.

External links
 

1980 births
People from Novomoskovsky District
Living people
Russian footballers
Association football midfielders
FC Khimik-Arsenal players
FC Arsenal Tula players
FC Torpedo Vladimir players
Sportspeople from Tula Oblast